Charles D. Cuthbert was an architect in the U.S. state of Kansas.  Several of his works are listed on the National Register of Historic Places.

Family
His father was James Cuthbert, who was born in Scotland in 1849, and became a building contractor in Topeka, Kansas.  Cuthbert & Sargent and Cuthbert & Sons are firm names which involved James and/or sons George M. (carpenter), William F. (carpenter), James R. (stone mason), John R. (bricklayer) and Charles D. (architect).

Career
Cuthbert studied at the School of Architecture (now Sam Fox School of Design & Visual Arts) at Washington University in St. Louis.  He became State Architect of Kansas in 1925.
He practiced alone and later was joined in partnership Cuthbert & Suehrk by Williem E. Suehrk, a classmate from architectural school.

Notable works
Works by the father's contracting firm include:
 Rice County Courthouse, 101 W. Commercial St., Lyons, KS, (Cuthbert and Son), NRHP-listed
 Rooks County Courthouse, 115 N. Walnut St., Stockton, KS, (Cuthbert and Sons), NRHP-listed
 Washburn University Carnegie Library Building, Off Seventeenth St. and Washburn Ave., Topeka, KS (Cuthbert, James, & Sargent), NRHP-listed

Works by Charles Cuthbert (individual or shared attribution) include:
 East Topeka Junior High School, 1210 E. 8th St., Topeka, KS Cuthbert & Suehrk, NRHP-listed
 Gem Building, 506-510 SW 10th Ave., Topeka, KS, (Cuthbert, Charles D.), NRHP-listed
 Westminster Presbyterian Church, 1275 Boswell Ave. Topeka, KS (Cuthbert, Charles), NRHP-listed
 Laboratory School, Kansas State Teachers College
 Music School, Kansas State Teachers College,
 Snow Hall and Hoch Auditorium (later renamed Budig Hall), University of Kansas campus (Cuthbert & Suehrk)

References

Architects from Kansas
Sam Fox School of Design & Visual Arts alumni